The Singapore Symphony Orchestra (SSO) is a symphony orchestra based in Singapore. Its principal concert venue is the Esplanade – Theatres on the Bay. The orchestra also gives concerts at the Victoria Theatre and Concert Hall, and performs about 100 concerts per year.  The orchestra was first established In 1978 with Choo Hoey its resident director. The orchestra's music director from 1997 to 2019 was Shui Lan, and Hans Graf as its Chief Conductor from 2020 onward.

History

Several orchestras were formed in Singapore in the colonial period and after independence. One of these, also named the Singapore Symphony Orchestra, was formed in 1945 by the Scottish composer Erik Chisholm in his capacity as ENSA Music Director for South East Asia. Some of its members were from the British army or air force bands, and though it was short-lived, it gave over fifty concerts and played with soloists such as the violinist Szymon Goldberg. Subsequently, until 1979, all orchestras in Singapore were composed largely of amateur musicians. Orchestras of the early periods included the orchestras of Singapore Musical Society, Singapore Chamber Ensemble, Singapore Youth Orchestra, as well as the short-lived Singapore National Orchestra formed by National Theatre Trust in the 1970s.

In 1973, at the opening ceremony of the Japanese Garden in Jurong, the then-defence minister Dr. Goh Keng Swee described the absence of a professional symphony orchestra in Singapore as "a minor scandal". An initial proposal to establish a national symphony orchestra was not accepted, as it did not plan for the inclusion of Singaporean musicians. In 1977, a largely amateur Singapore Philharmonic Orchestra was formed under the leadership of Yoshinao Osawa. Its success spurred further interest in the idea of a national symphony orchestra. After consulting with conductor Choo Hoey about the feasibility of setting up an orchestra that would include Singaporean musicians, Goh Keng Swee persuaded the Cabinet to support the establishment of a professional orchestra. The orchestra would be supported by public funds, and was intended to serve as a flagship arts company for the enrichment of the local culture scene. In 1978, with the support of the Cabinet, the Singapore Symphony Orchestra was registered as Singapore Symphonia Co. and rehearsals began in December, with 8 Singaporean members and 27 members from overseas.

The SSO made its debut with its first performance at the Singapore Conference Hall on 24 January 1979, with its first Resident Conductor Choo Hoey. The orchestra had 41 members, 14 of whom were Singaporean. The Singapore Symphony Chorus was then formed on 1 October 1980. On 1 October 1980, the Victoria Theatre and Concert Hall became home to the orchestra and was officially opening ceremony by Prime Minister of Singapore Lee Kuan Yew.

In 1983, the SSO gave its first outdoor concert at the Istana. Later, in 1985, the SSO made its first European tour, visiting ten cities within Scandinavia, and also performed at the Singapore Botanic Gardens for the first time, conducted by Lim Yau. From 1986 to 1991 (and briefly in 2001), the SSO also created a series of concerts entitled New Music Forum which focused on highlighting Singaporean composers. Additionally, in 1995, Okko Kamu was named principal guest conductor of the SSO. 

Choo Hoey stepped down as music director in July 1996 and took up the title of conductor emeritus, while Lan Shui became the orchestra's next music director in 1997. In 1999, the SSO performed at the National Day Parade. In 2003, the orchestra moved to its current performance venue, the Esplanade – Theatres on the Bay. The SSO expanded to its target of about 90 musicians by the early 1990s.

In January 2016, the SSO took over management and operational responsibility for the Singapore National Youth Orchestra, which until then was managed by the Ministry of Education.

In January 2019, Lan Shui stood down as music director, and was given the title of conductor laureate. In 2019, the SSO celebrated its 40th anniversary with a gala concert.

Hans Graf first guest-conducted the SSO in 2015, and returned for a further guest engagement in 2018. In July 2019, the SSO announced the appointment of Graf as its new chief conductor, effective with the 2020-2021 season.

Concerts and repertoire 

The main performing venue for the orchestra is the Esplanade Concert Hall, but concerts are also regularly held at the Victoria Concert Hall. It gives regular free performances and lunch time concerts at venues such as the Botanic Gardens and Gardens by the Bay. It also performs in schools and colleges and has a Community Outreach programme to promote classical music to the wider community. The orchestra has toured around the world; notable concerts include performances at the Berlin Philharmonie, New York's Avery Fisher Hall, Beijing's Poly Theatre, and The Proms in London.

The repertoire of the orchestra includes Western classical music ranging from early baroque to contemporary classical music as well as Chinese works composed or arranged for a Western orchestra. This is reflected in the program for its inaugural concert that included Rossini's Overture, Beethoven's Piano Concerto No. 5 (soloist Ong Lip Tat), Charles Ives' The Unanswered Question, and the Chinese orchestral piece Dance of the Yao People.

Recordings

The SSO has made many recordings with BIS Records and other labels. These include the first recording of the complete cycle of Alexander Tcherepnin's six piano concertos and four symphonies on BIS. Other releases include recordings of works by Rachmaninov released in 2012 and 2013 with Yevgeny Sudbin, and the 2007 recordings of Claude Debussy's La Mer.

Music Directors / Chief Conductors
 Choo Hoey (Music Director, 1979–1996)
 Lan Shui (Music Director, 1997–2019)
 Hans Graf (Chief Conductor, from mid-2020)

See also
Singapore National Youth Orchestra
Music of Singapore

References

External links
 Official website of the Singapore Symphony Orchestra

 Rob Barnett, 'Review: Alexander Tcherepnin (1899-1977) Complete Symphonies and Piano Concertos'  MusicWeb International blog, 11 March 2011

Musical groups established in 1979
Singaporean orchestras